Pelochyta brunnescens is a moth of the family Erebidae. It was described by Walter Rothschild in 1909. It is found in Peru, Ecuador and Panama.

References

Pelochyta
Moths described in 1909